Scott Zahra (born 7 June 1974) is a former Australian former professional rugby league footballer who played in the 1990s for the Gold Coast Chargers in the Australian National Rugby League competition.

Background
Zahra was born in Southport, Queensland.

Playing career
Zahra made his first grade debut for the Gold Coast in Round 1 1997 against Western Suburbs which ended in a 24–16 victory.  Zahra's final game in first grade was in Round 17 1998 against North Queensland.

References

1974 births
Living people
Australian rugby league players
Gold Coast Chargers players
Rugby league players from Gold Coast, Queensland